Chironia baccifera, known as Christmas berry (a name it shares with Passerina ericoides), bitterbossie or aambeibessie, is species of Chironia native to southern South Africa. A bushy shrub, it can reach 1m, but is typically 0.5m in width and height. Its Afrikaans name aambeibessie refers to its supposed medicinal use in treating haemorrhoids. It is used as an ornamental, preferring sandy soils. It is mildly toxic.

References

Gentianaceae
Endemic flora of South Africa
Garden plants of Southern Africa
Taxa named by Carl Linnaeus
Plants described in 1753